Somerset Archibald Beaumont DL, FRGS (6 February 1835 – 8 December 1921) was a British Liberal politician.

Beaumont was the third son of the politician Thomas Wentworth Beaumont and his wife Henrietta Jane Emma Hawks Atkinson, daughter of John Atkinson. His younger brother was Wentworth Beaumont, 1st Baron Allendale. Beaumont was educated at Harrow School and then at Trinity College, Cambridge. He stood successfully in a by-election for Newcastle-upon-Tyne in 1860, a seat he held until 1865. In the general election of 1868 Beaumont was returned to the House of Commons again and sat as Member of Parliament (MP) for Wakefield until 1874. He was one of the founders of the Anglo-Austrian Bank.

Beaumont was a Fellow of the Royal Geographical Society and a Deputy Lieutenant of Northumberland.  He died in 1921 aged 86, unmarried and childless.

References

External links 
 

1835 births
1921 deaths
Alumni of Trinity College, Cambridge
Deputy Lieutenants of Northumberland
Fellows of the Royal Geographical Society
Liberal Party (UK) MPs for English constituencies
People educated at Harrow School
UK MPs 1859–1865
UK MPs 1868–1874
Politics of Wakefield